The 2006–07 Moldovan Cup was the 16th season of the Moldovan annual football cup competition. The competition started on 27 August 2006 with the preliminary round and ended with the final held on 9 May 2007.

Preliminary round
20 teams entered this round. The games were played on 27 August 2006.

|}

First round
The ten winners from the previous round entered this round, in addition to 12 new teams. The games were played on 5 September 2006.

|}

Intermediate round
The games were played on 19 September 2006.

|}

Round of 16
The games were played on 27 and 28 September 2006.

|}

Quarter-finals
The first legs were played on 18  and 19 October 2006. The second legs were played on 1 November 2006.

|}

Semi-finals
The first legs were played on 7 April 2007. The second legs were played on 22 and 23 April 2007.

|}

Final

References
 
 

Moldovan Cup seasons
Moldovan Cup
Moldova